The Coalition for Life and Family or  (fr, CPVF) is a European political party that especially opposes abortion and promotes traditional family values against homosexuality. In 2017, the party requested recognition by the European Parliament and the political party funding that this entails. This was granted for 2017, as the party had eight members of national and regional parliaments (required: seven) from seven countries (required: seven).

The main activity of the CPVF is carried by the French organisation Civitas. Civitas has acted as a party since April 2016. Civitas can be categorised as arch-conservative Catholic nationalist, and far-right.  The party is close to the Society of Saint Pius X. The party chairman is the Belgian Alain Escada, who is also chairman of Civitas. Civitas member François-Xavier Peron is the co-founder of CPVF. In France, Civitas and Escada cooperate closely with the convicted holocaust denier Jean-Marie Le Pen and the Parti de la France.

CPVF has no members in the European Parliament, but members in the national and regional parliaments of Austria, Greece, Italy, Latvia, Lithuania, Poland, Spain and Slovakia. Surprisingly, CPVF's former Latvian member, Mihails Zemļinskis is a member of Social Democratic Party "Harmony", while this party's only member of European Parliament, Andrejs Mamikins, sat with the Progressive Alliance of Socialists and Democrats group.

References 

Political parties in Europe
Catholic political parties
Far-right politics in Europe
Political parties established in 2016
Far-right politics in France